Lovreć is a municipality in Croatia in the Split-Dalmatia County. It has a population of 2,500 (2001 census), 100% which are Croats.  Nearby Lovreć are a few villages, including, Olujići, Dumancići and Kasumi, Šimundići, Čaljkušići, Bekavci, Milinovići, Nosići, Jelići, Petričevići, Nikolići, Ćorići.

Famous people 
Šimun Milinović

Municipalities of Croatia
Populated places in Split-Dalmatia County